Fraggle Rockin': A Collection (marketed before release as The Fraggle Rockin' Collection) is a three-disc CD box set of music from the TV series Fraggle Rock, released by KOCH Records on October 30, 2007. The set contains 53 tracks. The three discs were originally released from 1983 to 1993 as three separate soundtrack albums.

The collector's edition includes photos and contributions from the original composers, including Dennis Lee and Philip Balsam, as well as sheet music for select songs.

Track listing

Disc 1: Fraggle Rock 
 Fraggle Rock Theme
 Follow Me
 Convincing John
 Doozer Knitting Song
 Do It On My Own
 Wemblin' Fool
 Why?
 Lost and Found
 Catch the Tail by the Tiger
 Brave Boy, Jump Up
 Muck and Goo
 Friendship Song
 Fraggle Rock Rock
 Beetle Song
 Easy is the Only Way to Go
 Our Melody

Disc 2: Music and Magic 
 Fraggle Rock Theme
 Pukka, Pukka, Pukka Squeetily Boink
 Let Me Be Your Song
 Wemblin' Fool
 Yes, We Can
 Catch the Tail by the Tiger
 There's a Lot I Want to Know
 Follow Me
 Friends 'Til The End
 Is It True?
 The Rock Goes On
 Pass It On
 Just Don't Know What Time it Is
 Convincing John
 Get Goin'
 Doozer Knitting Song
 The Way I've Go To Go
 Only Way Home
 Stuff Samba
 Sweet, Sweet Little Treat
 Closing Theme

Disc 3: Perfect Harmony 
 Fraggle Rock Theme
 Go with the Flow
 Perfect Harmony
 Without a Hat
 Music Box
 Here to There
 Sail Away
 Workin'
 Dum De Dum
 Ragtime Queen
 I Seen Troubles
 Dreaming of Someone
 Pantry Chant
 Helping Hand
 Time to Live as One
 Closing Theme

See also 
 Fraggle Rock

References

External links

2007 compilation albums
2007 soundtrack albums
Fraggle Rock albums
E1 Music soundtracks